Radyo Bandera 98.1 News FM (98.1 FM) is a radio station owned and operated by Bandera News Philippines. Its studios and transmitter are located at Brgy. Dajay, Surallah.

It was formerly owned by Kaissar Broadcasting Network and operated by Sagay Broadcasting Corporation under the Muews Radio network from 2010 to 2018.

References

Radio stations in South Cotabato
Radio stations established in 2010